The Hamburg Presbyterian Church is a historic church at the junction of Cherry and Lincoln Streets in Hamburg, Arkansas.  The building, a single story wood-frame structure, has an unusual construction history.  It was built in 1871, and was apparently stylistically decorated in Stick Style, although no historic photos of the building have been found.  In c. 1920 the building underwent a series of alterations, including relocation or reconstruction of its tower to its present location, when it had originally been at the entrance.  It is at this time that the cornice bracketing and half-timbering was added, giving the building a Craftsman style appearance.

The building was listed on the National Register of Historic Places in 1991.  It was sold to the Hamburg Garden Club in the 1980s, which maintained its c. 1920 appearance.

See also
National Register of Historic Places listings in Ashley County, Arkansas

References

Presbyterian churches in Arkansas
Churches on the National Register of Historic Places in Arkansas
Churches completed in 1920
Churches in Ashley County, Arkansas
National Register of Historic Places in Ashley County, Arkansas
1920 establishments in Arkansas
American Craftsman architecture in Arkansas
Bungalow architecture in Arkansas
Presbyterian Church